Earl Jack Perkins (September 19, 1921 – March 7, 1998) was an American film actor. He appeared in over one hundred films from 1956 to 1983, toward the end of his career mainly as a comic drunk.

Background
Born in Medford, Wisconsin, Perkins served in the United States Marine Corps during World War II. He then went to what is now University of Wisconsin–Eau Claire where he played football and then played football with the Chicago Rockets.

Filmography

References

External links

 
 

1921 births
1998 deaths
People from Medford, Wisconsin
Male actors from Wisconsin
Wisconsin–Eau Claire Blugolds football players
Chicago Rockets players
American male film actors
American male television actors
United States Marine Corps personnel of World War II
Military personnel from Wisconsin
20th-century American male actors
United States Marines